Gayle Kawaipuna Prejean (April 14, 1943 – April 14, 1992) 
was a Hawaiian nationalist, activist and advocate for the Hawaiian sovereignty movement.  Prejean was founder of the Hawaiian Coalition of Native Claims, now known as the Native Hawaiian Legal Corporation.

A pioneer of sovereignty during the "Hawaiian Renaissance" of the 1970s, Prejean was one of the first voices to advocate for Kanaka Maoli (native Hawaiian) independence at the United Nations in Geneva, Switzerland.  He was involved in the formation of the movement to stop the bombing of the island of Kahoolawe by the U.S. Navy; this was an issue which catalyzed the formation of the modern "Hawaiian Movement".

Prejean was known for his music and "stand-up" comedy as well as for his unrelenting criticism of the U.S. military presence in Hawaii. It was Kawaipuna Prejean who originally proposed the convening of the 1993 Kanaka Maoli Tribunal, and other historical actions which were carried out after his death.

Kawaipuna Prejean died on his 49th birthday while fighting to stop the construction of Interstate H-3, which destroyed many ancient Hawaiian sites and substantially impacted native species along its path on the island of Oahu, including several probable extinctions.

See also 

Hawaiian sovereignty movement

Notes

External links
https://web.archive.org/web/20050301092226/http://www.woodstocknation.org/aloha.htm
https://web.archive.org/web/20050428223633/http://www.namaka.com/catalog/misc/hookuokoa.html
http://ilind.net/gallery_old/stand-together-1976/source/pko-rally_4-3.htm
https://web.archive.org/web/20050428051310/http://www.namaka.com/catalog/misc/funeral.html

1943 births
1992 deaths
Native Hawaiian politicians
Native Hawaiian nationalists